Lord Davidson can refer to:
Randall Davidson, 1st Baron Davidson of Lambeth (1848–1930)
Neil Davidson, Baron Davidson of Glen Clova (born 1950)
Holders of the Viscountcy of Davidson (created 1937):
J. C. C. Davidson, 1st Viscount Davidson (1889–1970)